Did You Know That There's a Tunnel Under Ocean Blvd (stylized in sentence case) is the upcoming ninth studio album by American singer-songwriter Lana Del Rey. It is scheduled for release on March 24, 2023, by Interscope and Polydor Records. The album features production by Del Rey, Mike Hermosa, Jack Antonoff, Drew Erickson, Zach Dawes, and Benji and includes collaborations with Jon Batiste, Bleachers, Father John Misty, Tommy Genesis, SYML & Riopy. It was preceded by the release of the lead single and title track, "Did You Know That There's a Tunnel Under Ocean Blvd", on December 7, 2022; the second and third singles, "A&W" and "The Grants," followed on February 14, 2023, and March 14, 2023, respectively.

Background and release 
Three singles from Did You Know That There's a Tunnel Under Ocean Blvd were debuted ahead of the album's release. On December 7, 2022, the album's title track, serving as the lead single, was released, and the album was made available for preorder. "A&W", the second single, was released on February 14, 2023. Both singles were met with critical acclaim, with the latter being named ‘Best New Track’ by Pitchfork. The third single and opening track from the album, "The Grants," was debuted on BBC Radio 1's "Future Sounds with Clara Amfo" program on March 14, 2023, and was subsequently released on streaming platforms.

Originally slated for a March 10, 2023, release, the album was pushed to March 24 on January 13, 2023, for undisclosed reasons. The album artwork was shot by Del Rey's frequent collaborator, Neil Krug, and chosen from 65 different images, including one where the singer appeared nude. Speaking on the decision not to use the nude image, Del Rey said she "wanted to reveal something about myself that I actually thought was beautiful", but later wondered if the decision to appear nude was an artistic expression or would be seen as fulfilling a need to be seen. She ultimately decided against using the photo to "let the songs do the talking for now". The album's track listing was revealed on January 13, 2023.

Composition 
Did You Know That There's a Tunnel under Ocean Blvd is a 16 track set, consisting of 14 songs and two interludes. The album is produced by Del Rey and Jack Antonoff, a frequent collaborator, as well as Mike Hermosa, Drew Erickson, Zach Dawes, and Benji; it features collaborations with Jon Batiste, SYML, Riopy, Father John Misty, Bleachers, and Tommy Genesis. In an interview conducted by Billie Eilish for Interview, Del Rey revealed that she wanted the music for the album to have "a spiritual element". She also revealed that making the album felt "totally effortless" in contrast to the "world-building" approach she took to writing Norman Fucking Rockwell!. "Margaret", the 13th track, was inspired by Antonoff's fiancé, Margaret Qualley, and features Antonoff's band, Bleachers. "Kintsugi" and "Fingertips" were described by Del Rey as "super long and wordy", containing her "innermost thoughts". The closing track, "Taco Truck x VB," was immediately suspected by fans to sample, interpolate, or involve her 2018 song "Venice Bitch" in some way following the release of the track list; in an interview with Rolling Stone UK, Del Rey confirmed these suspicions, stating that the track would be "the grimy, heavy, original and unheard version of 'Venice Bitch.'"

Track listing

Release history

Notes

References

2023 albums
Lana Del Rey albums
Interscope Records albums
Polydor Records albums
Upcoming albums